Richard Boateng (born 10 July 1992) is a Ghanaian footballer who plays as a central midfielder.

Club career
Born in Accra, Boateng made his senior debuts with Liberty Professionals FC, but moved to Spain in the 2010 summer, joining Granada CF's reserve team in the regional leagues. On 26 January 2012 he was loaned to Cádiz CF, but only appeared with the B-side in Tercera División.

On 27 July 2012, Boateng moved to CD San Roque de Lepe in Segunda División B, also in a temporary deal; he appeared in 36 matches (2511 minutes of action), scoring two goals, but the Andalusians were relegated nonetheless. Upon returning he was assigned to Granada's B-side, now also in the third division.

On 28 February 2014 Boateng played his first match as a professional, coming on as a second-half substitute in a 0–4 La Liga loss at Athletic Bilbao. He spent the remainder of his spell with the B-side, however.

On 1 January 2017, after an unassuming spell at Aris Limassol FC, Boateng joined third-tier side Extremadura UD. On 3 August, he moved to fellow league team UD Melilla.

Boateng scored a career-best 14 goals for Melilla during his first campaign, including braces against Betis Deportivo Balompié, Córdoba CF B and former side Granada B. On 15 June 2018, he signed a two-year contract with Segunda División side Real Oviedo.

On 28 January 2019, Boateng moved to fellow second division side AD Alcorcón on loan until June. On 15 July, after featuring regularly, he signed a permanent two-year contract with the Alfareros.

On 16 June 2021, free agent Boateng agreed to a contract with FC Cartagena, also in the second division.

References

External links

1992 births
Living people
Footballers from Accra
Ghanaian footballers
Divisiones Regionales de Fútbol players
Club Recreativo Granada players
Cádiz CF B players
CD San Roque de Lepe footballers
Granada CF footballers
Aris Limassol FC players
Extremadura UD footballers
UD Melilla footballers
Real Oviedo players
AD Alcorcón footballers
FC Cartagena footballers
Maccabi Bnei Reineh F.C. players
La Liga players
Segunda División players
Segunda División B players
Tercera División players
Israeli Premier League players
Ghanaian expatriate footballers
Expatriate footballers in Spain
Expatriate footballers in Cyprus
Expatriate footballers in Israel
Ghanaian expatriate sportspeople in Spain
Ghanaian expatriate sportspeople in Cyprus
Ghanaian expatriate sportspeople in Israel
Association football midfielders